The 1996 Cork Senior Football Championship was the 108th staging of the Cork Senior Football Championship since its establishment by the Cork County Board in 1887. The draw for the opening fixtures took place on 10 December 1995. The championship began on 27 April 1996 and ended on 20 October 1996.

Bantry Blues entered the championship as the defending champions, however, they were defeated by Beara at the quarter-final stage.

On 20 October 1996, Clonakilty won the championship following a 1–09 to 0–10 defeat of University College Cork in the final. This was their 8th championship title overall and their first title since 1952.

Colin Corkery from the Nemo Rangers club was the championship's top scorer with 0-21.

Team changes

To Championship

Promoted from the Cork Intermediate Football Championship
 Dohenys

Results

First round

Second round

Quarter-finals

Semi-finals

Final

Championship statistics

Top scorers

Overall

In a single game

Miscellaneous
 Clonakilty win the title for the first time since 1952.
 University College Cork qualify for the final for the first time since 1980.

References

Cork Senior Football Championship
Cork Senior Football Championship